The 2022–2023 mpox outbreak in Peru is a part of the outbreak of human mpox caused by the West African clade of the monkeypox virus. The outbreak reached Peru on 26 June 2022.

Background

History 

The first suspected case of infection in the country was reported on 30 May 2022, when health authorities in the department of Piura reported the identification of a 70-year-old patient who presented symptoms compatible with mpox and was isolated in the intensive care unit (ICU) of the Santa Rosa Hospital (Piura).

Statistics

Cumulative cases

Nationwide

By region

Daily cases

By region

By date

See also 

 2022-2023 mpox outbreak

References

Peru
Mpox
Mpox